Patrick Henry High School may refer to:
Patrick Henry High School (California) 
Patrick Henry High School (Stockbridge, Georgia)
Patrick Henry High School (Minneapolis)
Patrick Henry High School (Hamler, Ohio)
Patrick Henry High School (Ashland, Virginia)
Patrick Henry High School (Glade Spring, Virginia)
Patrick Henry High School (Roanoke, Virginia)